Castellaro is a comune (municipality) in the Province of Imperia in the Italian region Liguria, located about  southwest of Genoa and about  west of Imperia.

Castellaro borders the following municipalities: Pietrabruna, Pompeiana, Riva Ligure, and Taggia.

Demographic evolution

References

Cities and towns in Liguria